Gabriel III, (? – 25 October 1707) was Ecumenical Patriarch of Constantinople from 1702 to 1707.

Life
Gabriel was born in the town of Smyrna (now İzmir) to parents coming from the island of Andros and in 1688 he became Metropolitan of Chalcedon. He was elected Patriarch of Constantinople on 29 August 1702 and reigned till his death. His reign had no particular troubles and was serene.

In 1704, Gabriel formally condemned the edition of the New Testament into Modern Greek translated by Seraphim of Mytilene and edited in London in 1703 by the English Society for the Propagation of the Gospel in Foreign Parts. On 5 March 1705, he issued an order forbidding the Greek students to study in London due to improper behaviours. In 1706, he issued a letter to condemning the Latin doctrines.

He also intervened in the affairs of the autonomous Church of Cyprus, deposing Germanos II of Cyprus after complaints of the local population. The Melkite Metropolitan of Aleppo Athanasius Dabbas was so elected in Istanbul as regent (proedros) Archbishop of Cyprus at end 1705. In February 1707, after Athanasius' return to Constantinople, Gabriel censored as non-canonical the consecration of the new Archbishop Jacob II, who nevertheless reigned until 1718.

With regards to his birth-town Smyrna, in 1706 he founded there a school where the scholar Adamantios Rysios taught. Gabriel died in Constantinople on 25 October 1707 and was buried at the monastery of Kamariotissa on the island of Halki.

Notes

17th-century births
1707 deaths
17th-century Eastern Orthodox bishops
Smyrniote Greeks
18th-century Ecumenical Patriarchs of Constantinople
Bishops of Chalcedon